The 1982 Winston Western 500 was a NASCAR Winston Cup Series race held on November 21, 1982, at Riverside International Raceway in Riverside, California.

Background
Riverside International Speedway was a race track or road course in Moreno Valley, California. The track was in operation from September 22, 1957, to July 2, 1989.  The original course design proved to be dangerous, and it was partially reconfigured in 1969.

Race report
Tim Richmond would defeat Ricky Rudd in the three hour long, 119 lap race which had 38 000 spectators in attendance. Seven seconds would end up separating the winner from the second-place finisher. Dale Earnhardt, recorded a last-place finish on lap 8 due to an oil leak. There would be 42 drivers on the grid; two of them were Canadian while the other 40 were born in the United States. Only one Chevrolet vehicle would participate in the race; driven by Jim Reich and owned by Ivan Baldwin.

Clive Skipton was the only non-qualifier for this event. Trevor Boys and Derrike Cope would make their introduction into NASCAR during this race while Reich, Jim Lee, and Terry Herman would retire after this race.

The total purse of the race would be $203,745 ($ when adjusted for inflation), the winner of the race would receive $24,730 ($ when adjusted for inflation) while 41st-place finisher Kevin Terris would receive $525 ($ when adjusted for inflation). Terris made his first Cup start in more than a decade but went out early with a blown engine. He would only make one further Cup start.

Qualifying

Failed to qualify: Clive Skilton (#61)

Top 10 finishers

Timeline
Section reference:
 Start of race: Darrell Waltrip had the pole position as the green flag was waved.
 Lap 5: Bobby Allison took over the lead from Darrell Waltrip.
 Lap 8: A sudden oil leak from Dale Earnhardt's vehicle made him the last-place finisher of the event.
 Lap 9: Tim Richmond took over the lead from Bobby Allison.
 Lap 12: Kevin Terris' vehicle suddenly developed engine troubles.
 Lap 14: Ricky Rudd took over the lead from Tim Richmond.
 Lap 15: J.D. McDuffie took over the lead from Ricky Rudd.
 Lap 16: Don Waterman took over the lead from J.D. McDuffie.
 Lap 17: Bobby Allison took over the lead from Don Waterman.
 Lap 20: The transmission on Joe Ruttman's vehicle stopped working properly.
 Lap 21: Tim Richmond took over the lead from Bobby Allison.
 Lap 31: Randy Becker's vehicle suddenly developed engine troubles.
 Lap 40: John Krebs had a terminal crash.
 Lap 42: An oil leak came out of Derrike Cope's vehicle.
 Lap 46: Bobby Allison took over the lead from Tim Richmond.
 Lap 48: Tim Richmond took over the lead from Bobby Allison.
 Lap 62: Rick McCray's vehicle suddenly developed engine troubles.
 Lap 72: Darrell Waltrip took over the lead from Tim Richmond.
 Lap 76: Harry Gant took over the lead from Darrell Waltrip.
 Lap 81: Tim Richmond took over the lead from Harry Gant.
 Lap 92: The transmission on Hershel McGriff's vehicle stopped working properly.
 Lap 94: Terry Labonte had a terminal crash.
 Lap 95: An oil leak came out of Harry Gant's vehicle.
 Lap 97: Neil Bonnett took over the lead from Tim Richmond.
 Lap 98: Tim Richmond took over the lead from Neil Bonnett.
 Lap 111: Bobby Allison's vehicle suddenly developed engine troubles.
 Finish: Tim Richmond was officially declared the winner of the event.

Standings after the race

References

Winston Western 500
Winston Western 500
NASCAR races at Riverside International Raceway